Kuh Sefid (also Romanized as Kūh Sefīd, Kūh-e Sefīd, and Kūh Safīd; also known as Safīdkūh) is a village in Qomrud Rural District, in the Central District of Qom County, Qom Province, Iran. At the 2006 census, its population was 333, in 75 families.

References 

Populated places in Qom Province